Middle Chinnock is a village in Somerset, England,  north east of Crewkerne, both in the South Somerset district.

Middle Chinnock was an ancient parish, which became a civil parish in 1866.  The civil parish was abolished in 1884 and absorbed into the parish of West Chinnock.  In 2003 the parish was renamed West and Middle Chinnock.

History

The origin of the name Chinnock is uncertain.  It may be derived from the Old English cinu meaning ravine or cinn meaning a chin shaped hill, with the addition of ock meaning little.  An alternative derivation may be an old hill-name of Celtic origin.

A Roman burial was found at Higher Farm, Middle Chinnock.

The Chinnocks were held as one estate in Saxon times by Wynflaed under Shaftesbury Abbey but by the time of the Norman Conquest in 1066 East Chinnock, West Chinnock and Middle Chinnock had been separated.

Governance
The West and Middle Chinnock parish council has co-responsibility for some local issues so sets an annual precept (local rate) to cover its costs and makes annual accounts for public scrutiny. It can submit its evaluation report into all planning applications and works with police, other councils' officers, and neighbourhood watch groups on matters of crime/security, traffic and highways. Conservation matters (including trees and listed buildings) and the environment can be in its reports and initiatives. It maintains and repairs some of, and consults with both higher-tier councils, as to more of, sports/leisure facilities, verges, parks, surface water drainage, paths, public transit and street cleaning.

The village is in the Non-metropolitan district of South Somerset, which was formed on 1 April 1974 under the Local Government Act 1972 from part of Yeovil Rural District. It is responsible for local planning and building control, most of streetscene/parks, council housing, environmental health, markets and fairs, refuse collection and recycling, cemeteries and crematoria, leisure services, and tourism. 
As to those councillors it is in its 'Parrett' electoral ward. This stretches from Chiselborough in the north, via East Chinnock to North Perrott in the south. The ward population at the 2011 census was 2,336.

Somerset County Council is responsible for running the largest and most expensive local services such as education, social services, libraries, main roads, public transport, policing and  fire services, trading standards, waste disposal and strategic planning.

It is served by the Yeovil seat in the House of Commons of the Parliament of the United Kingdom.

Church

Ecclesiastically, the parish of Middle Chinnock is now part of the united benefice of Norton-sub-Hamdon, West Chinnock, Chiselborough and Middle Chinnock.

The parish Church of Saint Margaret has 12th-century origins. The tower and south porch were built in the 14th or 15th centuries with most of the remainder of the building being rebuilt in phases during the 19th century. It has been designated as a Grade II* listed building.

Notable residents
 Victor James Marks, former Somerset and England cricketer was born in Middle Chinnock in 1955.
 Stirling Voules, England cricketer, born in Middle Chinnock in 1843.
Retired navy captain John Warde (1851–1936) CBE, JP died a resident of Middle Chinnock.
Retired navy captain Arthur E P Welman (1893–1966), awarded the Croix de Guerre and Legion of Honour, one-term vice-president of the Royal Free Hospital and for life a governor. Died a resident of Middle Chinnock.

References

External links

Villages in South Somerset
Former civil parishes in Somerset